David Henry Adamson (born 7 May 1951) is an English former professional footballer who played in the Football League, as a defender between 1969 and 1985, he also made appearances for the England national C team. He made over 250 appearances and scored more than 132 goals in his career.

References
General
 . Retrieved 29 October 2013.
Specific

1951 births
Living people
Sportspeople from Chester-le-Street
Footballers from County Durham
English footballers
Association football defenders
South Shields F.C. (1936) players
Durham City A.F.C. players
Doncaster Rovers F.C. players
Boston United F.C. players
Grantham Town F.C. players
Hatfield Main F.C. players
English Football League players
England semi-pro international footballers